Father Anchieta Foundation (Portuguese: Fundação Padre Anchieta) is a Brazilian non-profit foundation of the state of São Paulo that develops educational radio and television programs. It was created by the government of the state of São Paulo in 1967 and includes a  national educational public television network (TV Cultura, Or Cultura. launched in 1969 in São Paulo, which is available in all Brazilian states through its 194 afilliates), two radio stations (Rádio Cultura FM and Rádio Cultura Brasil, both broadcasting to Greater São Paulo), two educational TV channels aimed at distance education (TV Educação and Univesp TV, which is available on free-to-air digital TV in São Paulo and nationally by cable and satellite), and the children's TV channel TV Rá-Tim-Bum, available nationally on pay TV. Father Anchieta Foundation is a foundation which maintains intellectual, political, and administrative autonomy. The foundation is named after Saint Joseph of Anchieta, a Spanish Jesuit missionary who was one of the founders of the city of São Paulo and copatron of Brazil.

Its activities are supported as follows:

 Governmental budget reviews which are approved by the Governor and legislative assembly;
 financial resources obtained from private funding raised through cultural fundraisers and advertising;
 partnerships with other radio and television stations;
 sales of recordings of its programs to viewers and listeners

It is the goal of the broadcasters of the Padre Anchieta Foundation to offer programming in the public interest, without influence from commercial or governmental interests.

The public resources dedicated to TV Cultura (that is, the gross budget of the Foundation) were R$74.7 million in 2006, but of those R$36.2 million were donated from private industry partners and sponsors.
In May 2007, Paulo Markun won an internal election to become Director-President of the foundation, replacing Marcos Mendonça.
Markun has worked at TV Cultura since the 1960s, and he ran unopposed.
The president of the Board of Directors is Jorge da Cunha Lima.

Board of directors

The Board of Directors of the Padre Anchieta Foundation is composed of 47 members.
Life members of the board, as well as elected members, are appointed largely through the influence of the state of São Paulo.
The government's role in the foundation's decision-making process  which goes against its stated principles  has been a topic of criticism.

References

Foundations based in Brazil
Publicly funded broadcasters